Herbert Kenneth Kunen (August 2, 1943August 14, 2020) was a professor of mathematics at the University of Wisconsin–Madison who worked in set theory and its applications to various areas of mathematics, such as set-theoretic topology and measure theory. He also worked on non-associative algebraic systems, such as loops, and used computer software, such as the Otter theorem prover, to derive theorems in these areas.

Personal life
Kunen was born in New York City in 1943 and died in 2020. He lived in Madison, Wisconsin, with his wife Anne, with whom he had two sons, Isaac and Adam.

Education
Kunen completed his undergraduate degree at the California Institute of Technology and received his Ph.D. in 1968 from Stanford University, where he was supervised by Dana Scott.

Career and research
Kunen showed that if there exists a nontrivial elementary embedding j : L → L of the constructible universe, then 0# exists.
He proved Kunen's inconsistency theorem showing the impossibility of a nontrivial elementary embedding , which had been suggested as a large cardinal assumption (a Reinhardt cardinal).

Away from the area of large cardinals, Kunen is known for intricate forcing and combinatorial constructions. He proved that it is consistent that Martin's axiom first fails at a singular cardinal and constructed 
under the continuum hypothesis a compact L-space supporting a nonseparable measure. He also showed that  has no increasing chain of length  in the standard Cohen model
The concept of a Jech–Kunen tree is named after him and Thomas Jech.

Bibliography
The journal Topology and its Applications has dedicated a special issue to "Ken" Kunen, containing a biography by Arnold W. Miller, and surveys about Kunen's research in various fields by Mary Ellen Rudin, Akihiro Kanamori, István Juhász, Jan van Mill, Dikran Dikranjan, and Michael Kinyon.

Selected publications
 Set Theory. College Publications, 2011. .
 The Foundations of Mathematics. College Publications, 2009.  .
 Set Theory: An Introduction to Independence Proofs. North-Holland, 1980. .
 (co-edited with Jerry E. Vaughan). Handbook of Set-Theoretic Topology. North-Holland, 1984. .

References

External links
Kunen's home page

1943 births
2020 deaths
20th-century American mathematicians
21st-century American mathematicians
Set theorists
Stanford University alumni
Topologists
Educators from New York City
Writers from New York City
University of Wisconsin–Madison faculty
American logicians